On the night of May 11, 2022, professional cyclist Anna Moriah "Mo" Wilson was fatally shot at a friend's home in Austin, Texas, United States. Police charged Kaitlin Marie Armstrong, a yoga teacher and realtor, with stalking and killing Wilson, in the belief that the murder was the result of romantic jealousy. When a warrant for her arrest was issued, Armstrong allegedly attempted to flee law enforcement. She was eventually captured in Costa Rica, where authorities say she had been trying to set up a new life.

Background

Victim
Anna Moriah Wilson was born on May 18, 1996, in Littleton, New Hampshire, the daughter of Eric and Karen (née Cronin) Wilson and the sister of Matthew Wilson. She grew up in Kirby, Vermont. Wilson graduated from Burke Mountain Academy in 2014, and from Dartmouth College in 2019 with a BA in engineering. Her obituary states she "enjoyed cooking, writing, and traveling – she especially loved Italy, Taco Tuesdays, maple creemees and playing Catan with her friends."

Raised in a family of athletes, Wilson developed a passion for cycling as a young girl. She was a nationally ranked junior skier, but had recently become a gravel cyclist. Before deciding to pursue her career as a professional cyclist full-time, she had worked as a demand planner for Specialized.

Accused
Kaitlin Armstrong (born November 21, 1987) grew up in Livonia, Michigan. She graduated from Stevenson High School in 2005, then attended Schoolcraft College and Eastern Michigan University. She has been described as a yoga teacher and licensed realtor. 

Armstrong was in a relationship with professional cyclist Colin Strickland. They briefly separated in the fall of 2021, by which point Strickland had met Wilson and began a brief romantic relationship with her. Armstrong and Strickland would later reconcile and resume their relationship.

Death and investigation
On May 11, 2022, Wilson was found deceased with multiple gunshot wounds "shortly before 10 p.m" at a friend's residence in Austin, Texas, where Wilson had been staying to compete in a big race in Hico. Hours before her death, she had gone out with Strickland for a swim at Deep Eddy Pool and afterward ate dinner. Strickland denied ever going inside Wilson's friend's house after dropping Wilson off.

An autopsy ruled Wilson's death a homicide, with two gunshot wounds located to the head and one in the chest that allegedly occurred "after she was already laying supine on the floor," according to a search warrant. Police named Armstrong a person of interest after video surveillance showed her black Jeep Grand Cherokee arriving to the Austin residence moments before the killing. She was taken into custody over an outstanding misdemeanor warrant for theft. Armstrong made no statement to the police when confronted about the video evidence of her vehicle; however, investigators observed she "turned her head and rolled her eyes in an angry manner" when questioned about how Wilson was with Strickland. She was released on a technicality stemming from discrepancies between her date of birth in the police department's database and the one in the warrant.

Police examined Wilson's phone and concluded that she was romantically tied to Strickland while he was still dating Armstrong. Strickland originally denied knowing the victim when first interviewed, but eventually admitted to the relationship and to keeping communication with Wilson hidden from Armstrong, going so far as to delete text messages from Wilson on his phone while saving her phone number under a pseudonym. Armstrong reportedly became aware of the relationship and expressed a strong desire to kill Wilson, telling an anonymous tipster that she "had either recently purchased a firearm or was going to." Strickland revealed he had bought two handguns for Armstrong and himself. Through a search warrant, police recovered two firearms from the house Strickland shared with Armstrong. A spent shell casing from one weapon, a SIG Sauer P365 handgun belonging to Armstrong, yielded a "significant" match with one found in the crime scene. The search warrant also revealed that Armstrong had visited a shooting range with her sister, Christine Armstrong, allegedly "to learn how to use a firearm". On May 17, an arrest warrant for first-degree murder was issued against Armstrong.

Arrest and trial
After spending 43 days at large, Armstrong was apprehended by the U.S. Marshals in a hostel in Santa Teresa, Costa Rica on June 29, 2022. In a press conference about Armstrong's capture, the U.S. Marshals said she had fled to Costa Rica using a passport "that did not belong to her but belonged to someone who was closely associated with her", as well as significantly changed her appearance and sought opportunities to teach yoga under a variety of aliases. They observed that her hair had been dyed and cut short and her nose bandaged and saw some discoloration around her eyes, which she reportedly said she obtained from a surfboarding accident.

Armstrong was arraigned on July 21, 2022, pleading not guilty to the murder charge. She is currently being held on a $3.5 million bond in Travis County Jail. The case is tentatively scheduled to go to trial on June 22, 2023. Armstrong had lost her bid to suppress evidence of her custodial interrogation with the Austin Police Department, which she argued was illegally obtained because she was not apprised of her Miranda warning. A federal charge of Unlawful Flight to Avoid Prosecution against her was provisionally dismissed as well and legal experts said such a motion was "routine" since she had a constitutional right to a speedy trial.

References

2022 crimes in Texas
2022 deaths
2020s in Austin, Texas
Crimes in Austin, Texas
Deaths by person in Texas
Deaths by firearm in Texas